Amahai is a nearly extinct Austronesian language spoken in the Moluccas in eastern Indonesia. It might actually be two distinct languages.

References

Central Maluku languages
Languages of the Maluku Islands
Endangered Austronesian languages